RMS Ebro was an ocean liner built in 1914 for the Royal Mail Steam Packet Company. She was later owned and operated by the Pacific Steam Navigation Company, Jugoslavenska Lloyd and finally by Companhia Colonial de Navegação. In her last incarnation, under the name Serpa Pinto, she made more crossings of the Atlantic during the Second World War than any other civilian vessel, leading to her being termed the Friendship vessel or Destiny ship. She was scrapped in 1954.

Construction
The Ebro was ordered by the Royal Mail Steam Packet Company from the Belfast shipbuilders Workman, Clark and Company. She was launched in September 1914, and was 468 ft long with a beam of 55.8 ft.

British service
The Royal Mail Steam Packet Company initially planned for Ebro to operate on the West Indies service in the Caribbean, but due to the start of the First World War, she made only a single voyage on this service, in April 1915. She was then requisitioned, together with her sister ship  and four other liners of the company, by the Royal Navy to serve as auxiliary cruisers armed with eight 6-inch guns, depth charges and mines. The ships joined the 10th Cruiser Squadron, where they served as convoy escorts throughout the war.

After the war Ebro was returned to the Royal Mail Steam Packet Company. The company decided to sell her to the Pacific Steam Navigation Company, which refitted her and then placed her on the New York – Chile service, sailing through the Panama Canal. She carried out this service until the 1929 Wall Street crash forced the company into bankruptcy in 1930. Ebro was then moored at Avonmouth until 1935.

Yugoslav service
In 1935 Ebro was sold to Yugoslavenska Lloyd and re-named Princess Olga. Under Yugoslav ownership, Princess Olga was used on the Dubrovnik – Haifa route, transporting passengers and general cargo. In 1940 Princess Olga was bought by the Portuguese company Companhia Colonial de Navegação.

Portuguese service
By 1940 the Second World War had greatly increased the numbers of people seeking to leave Europe for the Americas. Companhia Colonial de Navegação operated the small and underpowered Colonial on the Lisbon – Rio de Janeiro route. During 1940 Colonial transported around 2000 people to Brazil. With the increased demand, and already overstretched with passenger routes from Lisbon to Angola and Mozambique, to the Portuguese State of India, Macau and East Timor, in 1940 Companhia Colonial de Navegação decided to purchase Princess Olga to carry greater numbers of passengers between Portugal and its colonies. Prior to this, the service had been carried out by pre-First World War liners, like Colonial and her sister ship Mouzinho, the former SS Corcovado. The Princess Olga was bought in April 1940, re-named Serpa Pinto and sailed to Lisbon. Her first voyage under the Portuguese flag was carried out soon after her arrival in Lisbon in May 1940, sailing to Lourenço Marques.

When Italy declared war on the Allies in June 1940, all Italian shipping routes were closed. Only three companies from neutral countries maintained their transatlantic routes. These were the Portuguese Companhia Nacional de Navegação and Companhia Colonial de Navegação and the Spanish Ybarra, from Seville. The Spanish company, however, did not have enough ships to best utilize the transatlantic routes.

From August 1940 Serpa Pinto began her service on the transatlantic routes between Lisbon, and Rio de Janeiro and North America (Philadelphia and New York).

She was repeatedly stopped in mid-Atlantic by German submarines and US Navy and Royal Navy ships for inspections. On 26 May 1944, on its way from Lisbon (departure 16 May 1944) to Port Richmond, Philadelphia, USA (arrival 30 May 1944), the Serpa Pinto was stopped in the mid-Atlantic by the German U-boat U-541. The U-boat's captain ordered the Serpa Pintos crew and passengers to abandon the ship in the lifeboats, and requested permission from Kriegsmarine headquarters to torpedo the ship. The passengers and crew, with the exception of the captain who decided to remain on board whatever the German decision, duly left the ship in the lifeboats. There they were forced to wait all night while the German U-boat awaited a reply to its request. By dawn an answer had arrived from Admiral Karl Dönitz, who refused permission to sink the ship. The U-boat then departed the area and the lifeboats returned to the ship. The ship's doctor, a cooker and a 15 months child drowned during this incident. Two military-aged Americans were taken in the submarine.

During the Second World War Serpa Pinto made ten voyages between Lisbon and Rio de Janeiro, and ten between Lisbon and Philadelphia and New York.  Since it was one of the few ships making transatlantic voyages in this period, many of the refugees from Nazi Europe who reached the United States and Brazil in this period traveled on the ship. (The other important but smaller ships were the Mouzinho and the Nyassa.) Some of the more notable refugees, most of whom were of Jewish background, included Marcel Duchamp, Simone Weil, Pierre Dreyfus (son of Alfred Dreyfus), Menachem Mendel Schneerson, Marc Rich, Alexis Kanner  and Naoum Aronson.

Also in this group were many children who came unaccompanied, without their parents, some of whom had been killed by the Nazis (see One Thousand Children).  Many of these unaccompanied children were aided in Europe and in transit by the American Jewish Joint Distribution Committee (the "Joint"), the French Jewish organization Œuvre de secours aux enfants, and the Hebrew Immigrant Aid Society (HIAS). One of these children became the rock impresario Bill Graham.

After the war Serpa Pinto remained on the Lisbon – Rio de Janeiro – Santos route until the company's new ocean liners Vera Cruz and Santa Maria entered service. Her last voyage to Brazil took place in July 1953. Afterwards she was placed on the Caribbean route (Lisbon – Havana) making 12 round trips to Havana, with stops at Vigo, Funchal, La Guaira and Curacao.

On 9 July 1954, Serpa Pinto sailed from Lisbon on her last voyage, São Vicente – Rio de Janeiro and Santos.

Scrapping
After her last voyage, Serpa Pinto remain moored in Lisbon until 5 September 1954, when she departed under tow for Antwerp, Belgium, to be scrapped.

References

Bibliography

1914 ships
Ships built in Belfast
Ocean liners
Passenger ships of the United Kingdom
Passenger ships of Portugal
World War I Auxiliary cruisers of the Royal Navy